The Quito Ecuador Temple is a temple of the Church of Jesus Christ of Latter-day Saints (LDS Church) under construction in Quito, Ecuador.

History
The intent to construct the temple was announced by church president Thomas S. Monson on 3 April 2016, during the Sunday morning session of the church's general conference.  The Harare Zimbabwe and Belém Brazil temples, along with a second temple in Lima, Peru, were announced at the same time.  The church later announced the second temple in Peru would be named the Lima Peru Los Olivos Temple.

There are currently more than 260,000 claimed church members in Ecuador. It is currently unknown how many are considered "active" church members as the church refuses to release those numbers.  Along with the Guayaquil Ecuador Temple, the country will have two temples when construction of the Quito Ecuador Temple is completed. On March 7, 2019, the LDS Church announced the groundbreaking to signify beginning of construction that was held on May 11, 2019, with Enrique R. Falabella, president of the church's South America Northwest Area, presiding.

The temple is planned to be completed in 2021. Delays are expected in response to the coronavirus pandemic, pushing the scheduled dedication of the temple back to 2022.

See also

 The Church of Jesus Christ of Latter-day Saints in Ecuador
 Comparison of temples of The Church of Jesus Christ of Latter-day Saints
 List of temples of The Church of Jesus Christ of Latter-day Saints
 List of temples of The Church of Jesus Christ of Latter-day Saints by geographic region
 Temple architecture (Latter-day Saints)
 Religion in Ecuador

References

External links
Quito Ecuador Temple at ChurchofJesusChristTemples.org

Proposed religious buildings and structures of the Church of Jesus Christ of Latter-day Saints
21st-century Latter Day Saint temples
Buildings and structures in Quito
The Church of Jesus Christ of Latter-day Saints in Ecuador
Temples (LDS Church) in South America
Religious buildings and structures in Ecuador
Proposed buildings and structures in Ecuador